Pratibha Shukla is an Indian politician and was member of the Uttar Pradesh Legislative Assembly.

Personal life
She was born in a village Radhan of tehsil Bilhaur, Kanpur.

Education
She got post graduate degree from CSJM University Kanpur in 1980.

Political life
Initially she worked in public as basic social worker and joined political party Bahujan Samajwadi Party in 2006.
2007: elected as Member of Legislative Assembly of Uttar Pradesh from Chaubepur (Vidhan Sabha constituency) as Bahujan Samaj Party candidate.
2017: elected as Member of Legislative Assembly of Uttar Pradesh from Akbarpur-Raniya (Vidhan Sabha constituency) as Bharatiya Janta Party candidate.  She got 87,430 votes in this election.
2022: elected as member of legislative assembly from Akbarpur Raniya constituency and sworn in as minister of state in the department of mahila kalyan, bal vikas evam pushtahar.

References

Living people
People from Kanpur
Uttar Pradesh MLAs 2017–2022
Bharatiya Janata Party politicians from Uttar Pradesh
1960 births
Uttar Pradesh MLAs 2022–2027